In mathematics, the spherical mean of a function around a point is the average of all values of that function on a sphere of given radius centered at that point.

Definition
Consider an open set U in the Euclidean space Rn and a continuous function u defined on U with real or complex values. Let x be a point in U and r > 0 be such that the closed ball B(x, r) of center x and radius r is contained in U.  The spherical mean over the sphere of radius r centered at x is defined as

 

where ∂B(x, r) is the (n − 1)-sphere forming the boundary of B(x, r), dS denotes integration with respect to spherical measure and ωn−1(r) is the "surface area" of this (n − 1)-sphere.

Equivalently, the spherical mean is given by

 

where ωn−1 is the area of the (n − 1)-sphere of radius 1.

The spherical mean is often denoted as

 

The spherical mean is also defined for Riemannian manifolds in a natural manner.

Properties and uses

 Spherical means can be used to solve the Cauchy problem for the wave equation    in odd space dimension. The expression itself is presented in wave equation article.

References

External links
 

Partial differential equations
Means